Latricia Trammell (born February 20) is an American basketball head coach for the Dallas Wings of the WNBA. Trammell has previously been an assistant coach for the Los Angeles Sparks and the San Antonio Stars in the league. She has also coached at the collegiate level.

Early life and education
Trammell grew up  in Oklahoma and was a prep star at Seminole High School. She scored a single game state record of 46 points. Following her high school years, Trammell attended Seminole State College and East Central University, where she earned a bachelor of science degree in biology in 1992 from ECU.

Coaching career
Trammell began her coaching career at the high school level. She coached in both Texas and Oklahoma and recorded a 105-45 record before she left for the collegiate ranks.

Trammell moved to Western State in Colorado and helped turn the program around and she ranks third all-time in program wins. She coached three years at Oklahoma City University where she helped guide that team to back-to-back NAIA National Championships. She was also named the NAIA Coach of the Year in both seasons that they won the title. Trammell moved onto Georgia State University where she was an assistant coach for two years.

San Antonio Stars
Trammell moved up into the professional ranks and joined the coaching staff for the San Antonio Stars of the WNBA in 2017. The 2017 was the final year for the Stars in San Antonio and Trammell was not retained when the team relocated to the Las Vegas.

Los Angeles Sparks
Trammell joined the Los Angeles Sparks staff in 2019 under head coach Derek Fisher. During her time in LA, Trammell was apart of her playoff seasons with the Sparks and was known for her defensive focus. She was in charge of a Sparks defense that put four players on WNBA All-Defensive teams, including 2020 Defensive Player of the Year Candace Parker.

Dallas Wings
Trammell got her first heading coaching job in the WNBA in the 2023 offseason when the Dallas Wings hired her.

References

Living people
American women's basketball coaches
Basketball coaches from Oklahoma
Basketball players from Oklahoma
San Antonio Stars coaches
Los Angeles Sparks coaches
Dallas Wings coaches
People from Claremore, Oklahoma
Year of birth missing (living people)